Sheikh Tushar Imran (born 10 December 1983) is a cricketer from Bangladesh who has represented his country in Test matches and One Day Internationals (ODIs). In January 2018 he became the first Bangladesh player to score 10,000 runs in first-class cricket. In November 2021, he announced his retirement from first-class and international cricket.

Career
Imran first hit the headlines aged just 17 when he made 131 from 106 balls in a domestic match for his side Khulna Division in 2000–01.
This was the same season in which Bangladesh were granted Test status and although he had to wait a while to join the Test team he made
his ODI debut in 2001.

His Test debut came against Sri Lanka at Colombo on July 28, 2002. He made 8 and 28 as Bangladesh were defeated by 288 runs.
In order to play the game he had edged out three former Bangladeshi captains in Naimur Rahman, Akram Khan and Aminul Islam which showed that the selectors were willing to invest in him.

He has so far struggled in the international stage but is a regular for Bangladesh A who he captains. He was first part of a Bangladesh A tour when they went England in the summer of 2005. Imran impressed with a run-a-ball 70 against Surrey.

In December 2016, during the 2016–17 National Cricket League, he scored his 19th century, the most first-class hundreds by a Bangladeshi. He was the top run-scorer in the 2016–17 Bangladesh Cricket League, with a total of 731 runs.

In January 2018, during the 2017–18 Bangladesh Cricket League, he scored his 10,000th run in first-class cricket. He became the first Bangladesh player to reach this landmark. He was the leading run-scorer for Central Zone in the 2017–18 Bangladesh Cricket League, with 725 runs in six matches.

In October 2018, during the 2018–19 National Cricket League, he became the first batsman to score seven centuries in the same year in domestic cricket in Bangladesh. He finished the tournament as the leading run-scorer for Khulna Division in the tournament, with 518 runs in five matches.

References

External links
 

1983 births
Living people
Bangladeshi cricketers
Bangladesh One Day International cricketers
Bangladesh Test cricketers
Cricketers at the 2003 Cricket World Cup
Khulna Division cricketers
Brothers Union cricketers
Sheikh Jamal Dhanmondi Club cricketers
Bangladesh South Zone cricketers
Kala Bagan Krira Chakra cricketers
People from Jessore District